Ubiquitin fusion degradation protein 1 homolog is a protein that in humans is encoded by the UFD1L gene.

Function 

The protein encoded by this gene forms a complex with two other proteins, NPL4 and VCP, that is necessary for the degradation of ubiquitinated proteins. In addition, this complex controls the disassembly of the mitotic spindle and the formation of a closed nuclear envelope after mitosis. Mutations in this gene have been associated with Catch 22 syndrome as well as cardiac and craniofacial defects. Alternative splicing results in multiple transcript variants encoding different isoforms.

Interactions 

UFD1L has been shown to interact with NPLOC4.

References

Further reading